Naval Air Station Pasco was a United States Navy air station located 2 miles (3 km) northwest of Pasco, in Franklin County, Washington, USA. After the war, it was redeveloped into Tri-Cities Airport.  One of its auxiliary airfields became Vista Field in Kennewick, but was closed in 2013.

History
The United States Navy built a naval air training station in the early 1940s at the site of Pasco Airport for World War II. During the first part of the war, the field was used to train beginning pilots for combat training. During the last half of the war, the mission shifted to training established pilots returning from battle in the use of newer aircraft. The field was one of the three busiest Naval aviation training facilities of the war.

After the war, the Navy sold the field to the city of Pasco, but still retains training privileges.  Several Navy aircraft, especially the P-3 Orion, use the field for landing and take-off training.

On June 9, 2011, the Port of Pasco Commissioners agreed to preserve the old Navy-built control tower located on the East side of the Tri-Cities Airport, Pasco. A non-profit group has been formed to help the preservation and upkeep of the tower.

References 

United States Naval Air Stations
Defunct airports in Washington (state)
Military installations in Washington (state)
Tri-Cities, Washington
Pasco, Washington
Military installations closed in the 1940s
Closed installations of the United States Navy